Devitsa is a rural locality (a selo) and the administrative center of Devitskoye Rural Settlement, Ostrogozhsky District, Voronezh Oblast, Russia. The population was 822 as of 2010. There are 15 streets.

Geography 
Devitsa is located 43 km north of Ostrogozhsk (the district's administrative centre) by road. Uryv-Pokrovka is the nearest rural locality.

References 

Rural localities in Ostrogozhsky District